This is a list of militia units of the Colony and later Commonwealth of Massachusetts.
Ancient and Honorable Artillery Company of Massachusetts (1638) 
Cogswell's Regiment of Militia (April 19, 1775)
Woodbridge's Regiment of Militia (April 20, 1775)
Simonds' Regiment of Militia (1776)
Sparhawk's Regiment of Militia (1776)
Ashley's Regiment of Militia (July, 1777)
Gill's Regiment of Militia (August 12, 1777)
Johnson's Regiment of Militia (August 14, 1777)
Storer's Regiment of Militia (August 14, 1777)
Bullards' Regiment of Militia (August 16, 1777)
Cushing's Regiment of Militia (August 16, 1777)
May's Regiment of Militia (September 20, 1777)
Wells' Regiment of Militia (September 22, 1777)
Wright's Regiment of Militia (September 22, 1777)
Holman's Regiment of Militia (September 26, 1777)
Reed's Regiment of Militia (September 27, 1777)
Gage's Regiment of Militia (October 2, 1777)
Whitney's Regiment of Militia (October 2, 1777)

See also
Minutemen
Massachusetts National Guard
Massachusetts Naval Militia
Massachusetts State Defense Force
List of Massachusetts Civil War units
List of United States militia units in the American Revolutionary War

References

External links
Massachusetts Militia Roots: A Bibliographic Study a publication of the United States Army Center of Military History

Militia in the United States
Massachusetts-related lists